İstanbulspor Kulübü is a Turkish football and sports club founded by Istanbul High School students in 1926. In 2004–05 they were relegated from the Turkish Süper Lig (Super League) to TFF First League. For many decades it was the fourth most famous and well-developed professional football club from Istanbul, coming after Beşiktaş, Galatasaray, and Fenerbahçe. After being bought by the Uzan Family in 1990, it has been repossessed by the government and resold to third companies.

Their greatest success is the Turkish championship title won in 1932.

History
İstanbulspor was founded by Kemal Halim Gürgen and Istanbul High School students on 4 January 1926, being one of the first sports clubs of the Turkish Republican period. In the 1931–32 season, İstanbulspor won both the Istanbul League and Turkish Football Championship.

Until 1990, the club was managed by Istanbul High School foundation. During this period, İstanbulspor has relegated from and promoted to the top division for several times. Also, it relegated to Amateur Level in 1979 and played on amateur level for two seasons. In 1984, club was relegated to third league.
In 1990, Uzan Holding, led by Turkish businessman Cem Uzan, has bought the club and converted it into İstanbulspor A.Ş., İstanbulspor incorporation. After that, Istanbulspor was funded by Uzan Family and promoted back to first league in 1995. Istanbulspor became one of the most successful Turkish football clubs again, as they reached the fourth place in the 1997–98 season and played in the UEFA Cup.
Uzan Family withdrew its support from İstanbulspor in 2001. Because of this, İstanbulspor fell into financial crisis, and became ninth in the 2002–03 season.

Eventually, in 2003, the Turkish government took over the financially collapsed club. However, Istanbulspor were relegated to the second league in 2004–05.
In 2006, İstanbulspor have been resold by the government to former Turkish player Saffet Sancaklı's Marmara Spor Faaliyetleri San. ve Tic. A.Ş. for $3,250,000.
In 2007, Ömer Sarıalioğlu, a Turkish businessman, bought the club from Saffet Sancaklı. İstanbulspor tried to avoid relegation at the last two seasons. İstanbulspor escaped from relegation in the 2008–09 season after finishing sixth in the Third Group. However, İstanbulspor finished the Second Group of the 2nd League next season as second from last and were finally relegated to the Third League, which is the fourth level of the Turkish football system. They played in the promotion play-offs in the 2012–13 and 2013–14 seasons but failed to achieve success. İstanbulspor finally promoted to the Second League, after defeating Zonguldak Kömürspor and Çorum Belediyespor successively in promotion play-offs in the 2014–15 season.

Colours and crest
The colours of İstanbulspor are yellow and black, which are the colours of Istanbul High School. Also white is accepted as a third colour, but this is not official. Having represented Turkey in an international competition, İstanbulspor was granted the privilege to use the Turkish flag in its emblem, located on the top left corner. The emblem of Istanbul High School is at the middle.

League participations
 Süper Lig (24): 1959–67, 1968–72, 1995–2005, 2022–
 TFF First League (18): 1967–68, 1972–75, 1981–84, 1992–95, 2005–08, 2017–2022
 TFF Second League (16): 1975–79, 1984–92, 2008–10, 2015–17
 TFF Third League (5): 2010–15
 Turkish Regional Amateur League (35): 1926-59, 1979–81

European history

UEFA Cup/Europa League:

UEFA Intertoto Cup:

Honours

European competitions
 UEFA Intertoto Cup
 Semi-finals (1): 1997

Domestic competitions
 Turkish Football Championship
 Winners (1): 1932
 TFF First League
 Winners (1): 1967–68
 Runners-up (1): 1994–95
 TFF Second League
 Winners (2): 1991–92, 2016–17
 TFF Third League
 Winners (1): 2014–15

Regional competitions
 Istanbul Football League
 Winners (1): 1931–32
 Istanbul Shield
 Winners (1): 1931–32
 Istanbul 2. Football League
 Winners (1): 1926–27

Others
 Spor Toto Cup
 Winners (1): 1970–71
 TSYD Cup
 Winners (2): 1996, 2000

Kit manufacturers and shirt sponsors

Club Officials

Players

Current squad

Out on loan

Retired numbers

Notable players
Europe
Bosnia and Herzegovina
  Aldin Čajić
  Fahrudin Omerović 
  Elvir Bolić
  Elvir Baljić
  Hadis Zubanović
  Enes Demirović 
Bulgaria
  Zdravko Zdravkov
Russia
  Oleg Salenko 
Turkey
  Zeki Çelik
  Volkan Babacan
  Ümit Davala

Asia
Iran
  Allahyar Sayyadmanesh

List of presidents

 1925–1935 Kemal Halim Gürgen
 1935–1941 Fethi Tanalay
 1941–1946 Murat Çelikel
 1946–1968 Ali Sohtorik
 1968–1970 Talha Dinçel
 1970–1972 Nirun Şahingiray
 1972–1973 Hayri Aydıner
 1973–1977 Hüseyin Taşdelenler
 1977–1978 Ural Aydıner
 1978–1980 Orhan Togar
 1980–1981 Dursun Öztürk
 1981–1984 Fethi Erhan
 1984–1987 Muhsin Sarıcı
 1987–1988 Mehmet Yıldırım
 1988–1992 Aziz Alturfan
 1992–1998 Cem Uzan
 1998–2002 Tayfun Gündoğar
 2002–2004 Adnan Sezgin
 2004–2006 Mehmet Akif Yaşin
 2006–2008 Saffet Sancaklı
 2008–2015 Ömer Sarıalioğlu
 2015– Ecmel Faik Sarıalioğlu

References

External links

İstanbulspor on TFF.org

 
Football clubs in Turkey
Association football clubs established in 1926
1926 establishments in Turkey
Süper Lig clubs